Erick Ibarra Miramontes (born June 28, 1973), best known as Alan, is a Mexican telenovela actor and one of the singers of the Mexican boy band Magneto. He sang with Magneto throughout the 1980s and 1990s. He also acted in several of Televisa's telenovelas and television series.

Career
He released his first solo album titled "Alan Azul", being the first single of this production "El aire que me das"and Alan finally decided to let himself be tempted by the world of acting.

Acting career
His first telenovela was Rayito de Luz. His second telenovela was Velo de Novia and his third hit telenovela was El Amor No Tiene Precio. His first (and only) television series was Univision's comedy Hospital el Paísa.

Personal life 
He has one sister and went to New York City and Rome to perfect his singing and acting. His nickname is "Robocop".

Filmography

Telenovelas
 "El Amor No Tiene Precio" as Victor Manuel Prado (2005/06)
 "Velo de novia" as Isaac (2003)
 "Rayito de luz" as Abel (2000)

TV series
 "Hospital el paisa" as doctor Vasconzelos (2004)
Cambiando el destino

References

1973 births
Living people
Mexican male telenovela actors
Mexican people of Basque descent
21st-century Mexican male actors
21st-century Mexican singers
21st-century Mexican male singers